Manas is a district of Talas Region in north-western Kyrgyzstan. The administrative seat lies at Pokrovka.

The district is named after the mythical Kyrgyz national hero, Manas, who is said to have been born in the Alatau mountains in the raion. A few kilometers outside Talas lies a mausoleum, supposedly that of Manas, called the Kümböz Manas. However, the inscription on its richly-decorated facade dedicates it to "...the most glorious of women Kenizek-Khatun, the daughter of the Emir Abuka".

The building, known as "Manastin Khumbuzu" or "The Ghumbez of Manas", is thought to have been built in 1334. It now contains a museum dedicated to the epic. A ceremonial mound also lies nearby.

Population

Rural communities and villages
In total, Manas District include 22 settlements in 5 rural communities. Each rural community can consist of one or several villages. The rural communities and settlements in the Manas District are:

 Kayyngdy (seat: Aral; incl. Kayyngdy, Nyldy, Sary-Bulak and Chech-Döbö)
 Kyrgyzstan (seat: Talas; incl. Kök-Döbö and Manas)
 May (seat: May; incl. Novodonetskoye)
 Pokrovka (seat: Pokrovka; incl. Bala-Sary, Jayylgan, Kara-Archa and Sögöt)
 Üch-Korgon (seat: Kyzyl-Jyldyz; incl. Ak-Tash, Jiyde, Kengesh, Chong-Kapka, Tash-Bashat and Üch-Korgon)

References 

Districts of Talas Region